

Table

Matches

Australia vs Yugoslavia

Brazil vs Nigeria

Yugoslavia vs Nigeria

Australia vs Brazil

Yugoslavia vs Brazil

Australia vs Nigeria

External links
 sports-reference

Group D
Group
1988 in Brazilian football
1988 in Australian soccer
1988 in Nigerian sport